The 1947 Miami Redskins football team was an American football team that represented Miami University during the 1947 college football season. In their fourth and final season under head coach Sid Gillman, the Redskins compiled a 9–0–1 record, outscored all opponents by a combined total of 240 to 97, and defeated Texas Tech, 13–12, in the 1948 Sun Bowl.

Miami University and Western Michigan College were admitted to the MAC in July 1947. Wayne University then resigned from the conference in protest over the admission of schools not located in urban centers. Because Miami and Western Michigan did not schedule a full slate of games against MAC opponents in 1947, they were not eligible to compete for the conference championship.

Schedule

References

Miami
Miami RedHawks football seasons
Sun Bowl champion seasons
College football undefeated seasons
Miami Redskins football